William Alfred Sheat (23 May 1899 – 24 May 1982) was a New Zealand Member of Parliament for two Taranaki electorates.

Early life
Sheat was born at Pihama, Taranaki, in 1899. He was the son of Joseph Sheat and his wife Susannah. He received his early education at Pihama Primary and Hawera District High School. He attended Victoria University College and graduated B.A. in 1920 and LL.B. in 1923. He married Ella Marjorie Newton, who was also a Victoria University College graduate (M.A. in 1925), on 22 January 1929. The wedding was held at St John's Presbyterian Church in Wellington. They had two sons, including Bill Sheat.

Sheat was admitted as a solicitor in 1922. He lectured economics at the Workers' Educational Association from 1923 to 1925. From 1926 to 1928, he taught at Marlborough College. From 1928, he farmed in Pihama.

Political activity

Early political career

Sheat served on the Egmont County Council for twelve years. He joined the National Party in 1940.

Member of Parliament
Bill Sheat represented the Patea electorate between 1943 and 1954 and then the Egmont electorate from 1957 to 1966.

After a 1953 redistricting much of the Patea seat (including his residence) shifted to the  electorate. The seat of  had been recreated and the home of the incumbent MP for Egmont, Ernest Corbett, was now situated in Stratford. Sheat did not wish to represent the enlarged, mostly rural, Patea and thought it appropriate that he instead contest Egmont and Corbett contest Stratford. However Corbett was selected again in Egmont instead of Sheat, leading Sheat to accuse the local party electorate organiser of predetermining the candidacy. On 14 May 1954 he resigned his seat with the intention of winning it back at a by-election as an Independent. He narrowly held the seat in the 31 July by-election, which National did not contest. He subsequently did not stand in the 1954 general election. In 1957 Sheat returned to Parliament as MP for Egmont after Corbett's retirement until he retired in 1966.

Sheat was Undersecretary to the Minister of Works between 1949 and 1954. Prior to his selection dispute he looked certain of gaining a cabinet post, but Keith Holyoake never forgave him for resigning and overlooked him when selecting his cabinet in 1960 and 1963. This was despite Sheat still defending the National Government against Labour's criticisms (particularly with regards to financial policy) while fighting the by-election as an independent candidate.

Death
Sheat died on 24 May 1982, aged 83 years. He was cremated in the Wellington suburb of Karori four days later.

Notes

References

1899 births
1982 deaths
People educated at Hawera High School
New Zealand National Party MPs
Independent MPs of New Zealand
Local politicians in New Zealand
New Zealand farmers
20th-century New Zealand lawyers
New Zealand Labour Party politicians
Members of the New Zealand House of Representatives
New Zealand MPs for North Island electorates
Unsuccessful candidates in the 1931 New Zealand general election
Unsuccessful candidates in the 1925 New Zealand general election